A list of notable politicians and members of the German Communist Party  (DKP):

A
 Hans-Henning Adler (now Die Linke)
 Kersten Artus (now Die Linke)

B
 Eva Bulling-Schröter (born 1956, politician, today 'Die Linke' (party))

C
 Emil Carlebach

D
 Franz Josef Degenhardt (1931–2011) 
 Christian v. Ditfurth (until 1983)

E
 Gisela Elsner

G
 Peter Gingold

H
 Alfred Haag
 Lina Haag
 Hannes Heer
 Hans Heinz Holz
 Jörg Huffschmid

K
 Gisela Kessler
 Franz Xaver Kroetz (until 1980)
 Maria Krüger

M
 Herbert Mies

N
 Harry Naujoks
 Otto Niebergall

P
Detlev Peukert

R
Max Reimann
Paula Rueß

S
 Sabine Wils
 Karl Schabrod
 Paul Schäfer (politician)
 Karl-Eduard von Schnitzler
 Karin Struck

T
 Uwe Timm (until 1981)
 Axel Troost (now Die Linke)

W
 Hannes Wader (until 1991)
 Christel Wegner

 
German Communist Party